Ansonia is a city in New Haven County, Connecticut, United States. The population was 18,918 at the time of the 2020 census. The ZIP code for Ansonia is 06401. The city is served by the Metro-North Railroad. Ansonia Station is a stop on the railroad passenger commuter service's Waterbury Branch connecting to New York's Grand Central Terminal. Ansonia also is served by the Connecticut Transit bus carrier. Connecticut Route 8 serves Ansonia (Northbound, Exit 18; Southbound, Exit 19).

Ansonia, also referred to as "The Copper City", is recognized for its history of heavy machine manufacturing industry in the lower Naugatuck Valley. Production included copper, brass, rubber and plastics processing, molding and tubing, iron castings, sheet metal, electric, automatic screw machine, textiles, and foundry products. The well-known Ansonia Clock Company was founded here in 1851.

Ansonia is the birthplace of David Humphreys, a diplomat and colonel in the American Revolutionary War.

History 
The area along the Naugatuck River, comprising the present Elm Street section of Ansonia and Derby Avenue section of Derby, was first settled by English colonists in 1652; it was originally a part of the township of Derby. Early settlers developed subsistence farming, and used the river for sawmills and gristmills.

In 1844, Anson Green Phelps (1781–1853), a merchant and philanthropist, wanted to expand the old borough of Birmingham (the present downtown of the city of Derby) to the north along the west side of the Naugatuck River to enable industrial development. Unable to purchase the land from its owner, in 1844 Phelps acquired land along the east side of the river; today this is Ansonia's downtown section. A canal was dug for river power to drive the factories and businesses in the new industrial village, which Phelps named "Ansonia". He wanted to name the industrial village as "Phelpsville", but learned there was another village in the region by that name. As suggested by a friend, Phelps changed his first name to create the name "Ansonia".

As industry developed, soon Ansonia became the most populous area of Derby, boasting many factories. The state chartered Ansonia as a borough of Derby in 1864 and amended it in 1871, granting full municipal privileges. In 1888, a petition was circulated in the borough of Ansonia for the purpose of becoming a separate township from Derby. In 1889 the State General Assembly granted the separation, constituting the Borough, Hilltop, West Ansonia, and Elm Street areas as a separate town known as Ansonia. This was the 168th township in the state of Connecticut. In 1893, Ansonia was incorporated as a city, consolidating with the coterminous Town and the old borough.

By the end of the 19th century, the city had manufacturers of heavy machinery, electric supplies, brass and copper products, and silk goods. Ansonia, Derby, Shelton, Seymour, and Beacon Falls formed one of the most important industrial communities in the state.

Invention of America's first bicycle 
In 1866, while residing in Ansonia, inventor Pierre Lallement, a native of Pont-a-Mousson, France, submitted a patent application for the first pedaled (rotary crank mechanism) bicycle.

20th century to present 

Ansonia suffered grievous damage in the Flood of 1955 on August 19, when the Naugatuck River flooded due to heavy rain from Hurricane Diane. Submerging the land along the river, the flood destroyed many houses and businesses. The high river waters swept away Maple Street Bridge, one of two bridges linking the east and west sides of Ansonia. After the inundation, the authorities erected a flood wall along the east bank of the river to protect the city's factories and Main Street. On the west bank, federal public housing was built to replace blocks of destroyed homes and businesses on Broad Street, now known as Olson Drive.

In the decades following the flood and suburbanization, Ansonia's Main Street fell into decline as retail shoppers decamped to the Ansonia Mall at its far end. (This was replaced with the Ansonia Shopping Center in the 90's) Later other malls attracted shoppers to nearby Milford, Trumbull, and Waterbury. Since the late 20th century, Main Street has been enlivened by the opening of several antique stores, a wine bar, a coffee shop, a Polish delicatessen, and other retail businesses.
Main Street now has a Target store near the currently abandoned building that housed American Brass Co. Wire Mill, later Farrel Corporation.

For years, Ansonia had a daily newspaper, the "Evening Sentinel", that enjoyed a wide readership throughout the Naugatuck Valley. However, the parent company of the Connecticut Post bought the Sentinel in the 1980s and quickly closed it, despite their promises not to do so. Allegedly, the "Post" wanted to consolidate their position as the region's main newspaper. To provide an alternative, a non-profit, online-only news site, named The Valley Independent Sentinel in honor of the historic paper, has been organized and launched June 22, 2009.

In the early morning hours of November 6, 1960, Senator John F. Kennedy's presidential campaign motorcade stopped on its way to Waterbury for the candidate to make an appearance and brief address in front of City Hall. He drew thousands to downtown, many with transistor radios tuned to live reports on WADS of Senator Kennedy's progress towards Ansonia. President Kennedy returned to Ansonia on October 17, 1962, while on his way to Waterbury, but did not stop here.

President George H. W. Bush paid a visit to Ansonia by helicopter during the 1992 presidential election campaign. He was running far behind schedule due to severe weather damage to a large area of New Jersey. He arrived late and delivered a truncated speech, causing many residents in this heavily Democratic area to feel he had slighted their city.

In 2000, the Lower Naugatuck Valley, which includes Ansonia, was named an "All America City" by the National Civic League.

Rubber plant fire 

In May 2001, a wind-driven fire destroyed the Latex Foam Company building, a very large rubber plant along the Naugatuck River in downtown Ansonia. The fire gutted the  building, which was the workplace of 250 people. Firefighters from multiple counties fought the fire tirelessly for five days. Lingering clouds of foul-smelling smoke spread over the city and nearby communities, and chemical runoff produced by the fire unbalanced the ecosystem of the nearby river. The aforementioned Target store was constructed on the empty lot, opening in July 2007.  Following the fire, the Latex Foam Company purchased a vacant plant off Route 110 in nearby Shelton and resumed production.

Mayors of Ansonia 

Total number of mayors:

 Democrats: 19 (66%)
 Republicans: 10 (34%)

Total number of years:

 Democrats: 95 (75%)
 Republicans: 32 (25%)

Superlatives:

 Longest-serving Democrat: James DellaVolpe, 14 years (19992013)
 Longest-serving Republican: David S. Cassetti,  years (2013present)

Geography 

The city is bisected by the Naugatuck River and spreads out from the river's banks up the hills—some quite steep—of the river valley. On the west side of the river, the city abuts Derby and Seymour along Silver Hill. On the east side, the city's Hilltop neighborhood meets Woodbridge.

The land along the river is mostly given over to factory sites (both operational and defunct), with an area of wooded land on the west bank close to the city's northern boundary that belongs to the American Brass Company. In the early 1990s, this site was proposed by Texas company American Ref-Fuel for a solid waste-to-electric energy cogeneration plant. The proposal was controversial, and protests by residents resulted in its defeat.

Residential housing occupies most of the land in Ansonia, chiefly one- or two-family houses on plots of a 1/4 acre up to an acre. Larger houses on larger plots are found in the Hilltop neighborhood. The Ansonia Nature Center on Hilltop preserves some open fields and woodlands and is a favorite for school trips.

An airport once operated on Hilltop on a grass field, at the eastern edge of the city. During the Cold War, the United States military deployed Nike missiles in silos at the airport. Since the military released the airport grounds for other uses, developers have built residential housing there. The Nike base is now adapted as a horse farm with riding stables; few reminders of its former operations remain.

Neighborhoods 

Downtown – The original industrial village and later borough of Ansonia. Includes the area stretching between the factories at the north side of down town to the newer shopping plazas on the south side of downtown (Big Y, Target, etc.)

Library District – The neighborhood surrounding the Ansonia Library. Just east of downtown on top of the cliff. Includes the residential neighborhood between State Street and Beaver Street including South Cliff Street, North Cliff Street, Mott Street and Cottage Avenue. Contains mostly single-family historic Queen Anne Victorian homes. While now predominantly middle class, this area was settled early in Ansonia's history and was once home to many of the wealthy industrial families of Ansonia.

North End – The area comprising the North Main Street corridor stretching from Downtown to the Seymour town line.

Reservoir – The area comprises the area of the Beaver, North Prospect, and Prospect Street corridors. It is along the Quillinan Reservoir.

Derby Hill – The area surrounding the Elm Street and Jewett Street area on the east side. Elm Street is also the town's historic district and was part of the original 1654 settlement of Derby. The name of this section of the town is sometimes disputed.

Hilltop – The area of the city that comprises the area of Prindle Avenue, Pulaski Highway and Ford Street corridors. This section was mainly farm land in the early days of the town. After World War II, it was developed as the largest residential area of the city.

West Ansonia – The residential village that comprised the west side of the Naugatuck River across from Ansonia (downtown). The original West Ansonia neighborhood consisted of High, Maple, and Jersey streets (the latter somewhat redirected and now known as 'Olson Drive'), and later its name was synonymous with the entire present west side of the city.

Windy Hill – A section of West Ansonia centered around Murray, May, and Francis street. This area is considered to encompass the territory from the Derby town line to Grove Street.

Silver Hill – The section of West Ansonia along the Silver Hill Road corridor. Parts of this section are shared with Derby.

Climate 

The climate in this area is characterized by warm to hot, humid summers and generally cool to cold winters. According to the Köppen Climate Classification system, Ansonia has a humid continental climate, abbreviated "Dfa" on climate maps. Alternatively, it can be classified as humid subtropical ("Cfa") depending on which temperature isotherm for January is used.

Demographics 

As of the 2010 census, the population of Ansonia was 19,249. The racial composition of the population was 77.6% white, 11.6% black or African American, 0.3% Native American, 1.9% Asian, 5.3% reporting some other race and 3.2% from two or more race. 16.7% of the population was Hispanic or Latino of any race.

As of the census of 2000, there were 18,554 people, 7,507 households, and 4,977 families residing in the city. The racial makeup of the city was 85.52% White, 8.42% Black or African American, 0.34% Native American, 1.13% Asian, 0.02% Pacific Islander, 2.22% from other races, and 2.37% from two or more races. Hispanic or Latino of any race were 7.42% of the population.

There were 7,507 households, out of which 31.4% had children under the age of 18 living with them, 46.1% were married couples living together, 15.6% had a female householder with no husband present, and 33.7% were non-families. 28.5% of all households were made up of individuals, and 12.3% had someone living alone who was 65 years of age or older. The average household size was 2.46 and the average family size was 3.03.

In the city, the population was spread out, with 24.2% under the age of 18, 8.2% from 18 to 24, 31.5% from 25 to 44, 20.7% from 45 to 64, and 15.5% who were 65 years of age or older. The median age was 37 years. For every 100 females, there were 90.6 males. For every 100 females age 18 and over, there were 86.9 males.

The median income for a household in the city was $43,026, and the median income for a family was $53,718. Males had a median income of $30,747 versus $28,517 for females. The per capita income for the city was $20,504. About 6.2% of families and 7.6% of the population were below the poverty line, including 12.3% of those under age 18 and 5.3% of those age 65 or over.

Politics

Economy 

Pulitzer Prize-winning author Theodore H. White referred to the Naugatuck Valley "as the seedbed of Yankee ingenuity" in his work The Making of the President, 1960. The city hosted the world headquarters of the Farrel Corporation, a leading producer of plastics and rubber processing equipment including the Banbury International Mixer. Ansonia Copper & Brass, which supplied metal rod, wire and tube products to manufacturers of finished commercial products, also was located in the city.

The Ansonia Clock Company started manufacturing Ansonia clocks in the city in 1851. The company moved to Brooklyn, New York in 1878 but retained its home city's name.

Since the late 20th century, much of the heavy industry has moved out, with jobs going overseas. The former factories sat vacant. In the late 1980s, the city began development of the Fountain Lake Commerce Park in the northwest border. It houses Spectrum Plastics and Homa Pump Co. In 2007, work was to begin by R.D. Scinto Inc. owned by Robert Scinto to further develop the park with a  office building.

Starting in 2002, city authorities and residents began a revitalization of the downtown area. Two large regional clothing retailers, Marshalls and Bob's, opened stores there in 2006. In 2007, Target, an international department store, constructed a new store at the former Latex Foam Company site (see "Rubber Plant Fire" above). In 2009, the Coca-Cola Freestyle was launched in the Ansonia Duchess restaurant. It was the first Freestyle machine in the world to be launched.

As a result of economic growth and plentiful employment in southwestern Connecticut, driven by corporate relocations from the New York City and Fairfield County metropolitan areas to nearby towns, Ansonia's housing market improved in the early 2000s. On the preferred East Side of the city, the average home price climbed almost 20% in the period from 2001 to 2006. Authorities are closing down federal housing projects on the West Side of town, in favor of a mixture of market-rate housing. There have been many changes in policy related to public housing. Due to a concentration of poverty in this area, it suffered a large percentage of the crime.

Transportation 

Ansonia is a station stop on the Waterbury Branch of the Metropolitan Transit Authority's Metro-North Railroad system. Trains on the Waterbury Branch run from Waterbury in the north to Bridgeport in the south, allowing Ansonia residents access to [New York City via transfer to the main line at Bridgeport. Travel time from Ansonia to Grand Central Terminal in New York City is approximately two hours.

Bus 
Ansonia is also served by buses of the F route of Connecticut Transit New Haven, connecting the city to New Haven.

Public safety 

Ansonia is protected by three municipal public safety agencies. It operates an Office of Emergency Management-based out of City Hall and the A.R.M.S building on West Main Street.

Police department 
The Ansonia Police Department was founded around 1880 when Ansonia was a borough in the Town of Derby and Daniel Hayes was appointed the first police chief of the department. Chief Hayes died in 1882 after he succumbed to his injuries day after when he was shot while making an arrest.

The Police Department has 42 sworn officers and 12 civilian personnel. The Police Department is split between the patrol and detective divisions. The Police Department headquarters is located in the renovated former headquarters of the Farrel Corporation on Main Street.

Landmarks 

In addition to the Farrel Corporation and Ansonia Copper & Brass facilities along the banks of the Naugatuck River in the center of the city, Ansonia's landmarks include its public library (Ansonia Library), the Anna Sewell Memorial Fountain (honoring the author of "Black Beauty"), in front of the Library YMCA, National Guard Armory and many Victorian and Queen Anne houses. The prominent Ansonia Opera House is the oldest opera house in Connecticut built in 1870.

Ansonia is noted for its many churches and places of worship, including those forming five Catholic parishes, each historically associated with a particular ethnic group: Saint Joseph (Polish), Holy Rosary (Italian), Saint Anthony (Lithuanian; now combined with Holy Rosary), Our Lady of the Assumption (Irish), and Saints Peter and Paul (Ukrainian). There are also Congregationalist, Methodist, Episcopal, African Methodist Episcopal, Baptist, Russian Orthodox, Greek Orthodox, Pentecostal and other Christian denominations, as well as a Buddhist temple.

In the mid-1930s, after its original high school that was located on Prospect Street (now a City park) burned down, a new one was built on Howard Avenue. This is notable in that the building was designed by William Lescaze, one of the pioneers of modernism in American architecture. When it opened in 1936, it was one of the first "modern" high school buildings in the country. The former high school became Ansonia Middle School in 1999 when a new Ansonia High School was built at 20 Pulaski Highway in the Hilltop section of the city.

Notable people 

 Tom Condon, attorney and prominent NFL sports agent
 John Cooke (1937–2005), gold medalist 1956 Olympic games, Melbourne, Australia; Ansonia High School graduate
 William J. Cousins (1924–2013), sociologist
 Joseph P. Flynn, distinguished jurist and chief judge of the Connecticut Appellate Court 2006–2010
 AR Fox, professional wrestler
 Samuel B. Gould (1910–1997), educator and innovator, graduated Ansonia High School (1926)
 Lorenzo Greene (1899–1998), historian and pioneer in African-American history; first black student to graduate from Ansonia High School
 Caitlin Hale (born 1991), actress, singer, and writer
 David Humphreys (1752–1818), aide-de-camp to George Washington, diplomat, legislator, entrepreneur, poet, and wit
 Vincent R. Impellitteri (1900–1987), mayor of New York City from 1950 to 1953; Ansonia High School (Class of 1917)
 General Samuel Jaskilka (1919–2012), assistant commandant of the Marine Corps]] 1975–1978, Ansonia High School graduate (1937)
 Pierre Lallement (1843–1891), inventor known for his patent application for the first pedaled (rotary crank mechanism) bicycle
 Sandy Osiecki, NFL player
 Anson Greene Phelps (1781–1853), founder of Phelps, Dodge mining and copper company, and Ansonia founder
 Nick Pietrosante (1937–1988), NFL Rookie of the Year 1959; played for Detroit Lions, 1959–1965, Cleveland Browns 1966–1967; family operated a neighborhood meat market on North State Street for many years
 Pincus "Pinky" Silverberg (1904–1964), boxer, flyweight world champion in 1927
 Bob Skoronski, NFL player for the Green Bay Packers, member of 1961, 1962, and 1965 NFL champion teams, as well as Super Bowl I and Super Bowl II championship teams
 Al Tinney (1921–2002), jazz pianist
 Reuben Henry Tucker III (1911–1970), U.S. Army colonel, during World War II; referenced in Cornelius Ryan's well-known work A Bridge Too Far; graduated Ansonia High School (1928)

On the National Register of Historic Places 

 Ansonia Library – 53 South Cliff St. (added September 23, 1985)
 Gen. David Humphreys House – 37 Elm St. (added April 17, 1972)
 Richard Mansfield House – 35 Jewett St. (added April 11, 1971)
 Upper Main Street Historic District (Ansonia, Connecticut) – 36–100, 85–117 Main St. (added 1982), which includes the Ansonia Opera House (built 1870)
 United States Post Office–Ansonia Main – 237 Main St. (added 1985)

Pictures

See also 

 1955 Connecticut floods
 Ansonia Clock Company, originating in Ansonia before moving to New York
 Ansonia High School (Connecticut)
 History of the bicycle, which was invented by Pierre Lallement in Ansonia
 List of high school football rivalries more than 100 years old

References

External links 

 City of Ansonia official website
 Ansonia Public Schools 
 Ansonia Public Library
 Derby Historical Society. The society was "Founded April 18, 1946, to serve the Naugatuck Valley towns of Ansonia, Derby, Oxford, Seymour, and Shelton."

 
1652 establishments in Connecticut
Cities in Connecticut
Cities in New Haven County, Connecticut
Cities in the New York metropolitan area
Populated places established in 1652